Bandbal-e Bala (also Romanized as Bandbāl-e Bālā) is a village in Qeblehi Rural District, in the Central District of Dezful County, Khuzestan Province, Iran. At the 2006 census, its population was 430, in 83 families.

References 

Populated places in Dezful County